The following squads were named for the 1956 Summer Olympics tournament.

Australia

Head coach: Richard Telfer

Bulgaria

Head coaches: Stoyan Ormandzhiev & Krum Milev

United Team of Germany

Head coach: Sepp Herberger

Great Britain

Head coach: Norman Creek

India

Head coach: S. A. Rahim

Indonesia

Head coach:  Antun Pogačnik

Japan

Head coach:  Shigemaru Takenokoshi

Thailand

Head coach: Bunchoo Samutkojon

United States

Head coach: Jimmy Mills

Soviet Union

Head coach: Gavril Kachalin

Yugoslavia

Head coach: Milovan Ćirić

References

External links
 FIFA
 RSSSF
 Yugoslavia squad at Serbian Olympic committee
 Great Britain team at British Olympic Association
EUROS

squads
1956 Summer Olympics